FLEX-Elektrowerkzeuge GmbH is a German producer of power tools with headquarters in Steinheim. After producing flexible shaft grinders since 1922, FLEX invented the "Flex" or angle grinder in 1954. The company created a partnership with American tool producer Porter Cable, until Pentair sold its power tool division to Black & Decker in 2004. Black & Decker divested itself of FLEX tools. In 2013 FLEX tools were taken over by Chervon Holdings Ltd.

In North America, FLEX sell mainly metalworking (grinders and polishers) and masonry power tools, but in Europe it also makes and sells woodworking tools.

In 2021, FLEX became the shirt sponsor for Los Angeles FC.

References

External links
 
 Inside woodworking web site info on FLEX tools

Companies based in Baden-Württemberg
Power tool manufacturers
Tool manufacturing companies of Germany
Manufacturing companies established in 1922
1922 establishments in Germany
German brands